The men's team pursuit at the 2022 Commonwealth Games was part of the cycling programme, and took place on 29 July 2022.

Records
Prior to this competition, the existing world and Games records were as follows:

Schedule
The schedule is as follows:

All times are British Summer Time (UTC+1)

Results

Qualifying
The two fastest teams advanced to the gold medal final. The next two fastest teams advanced to the bronze medal final.

Finals

References

Cycling at the Commonwealth Games – Men's team pursuit
Men's team pursuit